Van Schaick House is a historic home located on Van Schaick Island at Cohoes in Albany County, New York.  It was built about 1735 and is a -story, brick dwelling with a gambrel roof.  Plans were made at the mansion for the Battle of Saratoga and the house was used by Governor Clinton as the New York State Capitol from August 22 to 25, 1777.

It was listed on the National Register of Historic Places in 1971.

References

External links

The Van Schaick Mansion, Van Schaick Island, Cohoes, NY

Houses on the National Register of Historic Places in New York (state)
Houses completed in 1727
Houses in Albany County, New York
Historic American Buildings Survey in New York (state)
National Register of Historic Places in Albany County, New York